John Russell Carlisle (28 August 1942 – 18 February 2019) was a Conservative Party Member of Parliament (MP) for the Luton West constituency and later Luton North constituency in Bedfordshire. Carlisle was Public Affairs Director of the UK Tobacco Manufacturers' Association from 1997 until 2001, even though he was a non-smoker.

Early life
The son of Andrew Russell and Edith Carlisle (maiden name Handley), he was born in Henlow, Bedfordshire and  educated at Bedford School, and  St. Lawrence College, Ramsgate. Carlisle married Anthea Jane Lindsay May in 1964; the couple had two daughters.

He was a senior executive (1964–78) of Sidney C. Banks Ltd., Sandy, Bedfordshire, a member of the London Corn Exchange (1970–79 and 1987–97), and was a Director of Granfin Agriculture Ltd., Stoke Ferry, Norfolk (1979–83). From 1982–87 he was a consultant to Louis Dreyfus plc., and to Barry Simmons PR (1987–97). He was a non-executive director of the Bletchley Motor Group, 1988–95, and of Charles Sidney plc, 1995–97. He was a member of the Baltic Exchange, 1991–97.

Political career
John Carlisle was Vice-Chairman (1973–74) and Chairman (1974–76) of the Conservative Party's Mid-Bedfordshire Constituency Association, and was elected MP for Luton West in 1979. For some time after his election he shared an office with future Prime Minister John Major. In 1983 he was elected MP for Luton North. He was Chairman of the Conservative Parliamentary Committee on Sport (1981–84), Vice-Chairman of the All-Party Football Committee, Secretary of the Conservative Parliamentary Foreign Affairs Committee (Africa) 1982–83, and was a member of the International Executive Committee of "Freedom in Sport". He was also Treasurer of the Anglo-Gibraltar Group, 1981–82, and was Secretary (1983–87), and Chairman (1987) of the British-South Africa Group. He was elected Vice-President of the Federation of Conservative Students in 1986 and was Governor of the Sports Aid Foundation (Eastern Region), 1985–96. He was a member of the Parliamentary Select Committee on Agriculture 1985–88.

He was an active member of the Conservative Monday Club and from c. 1980 to 1982 was Chairman of their Foreign Affairs Committee. He was guest-of-honour at the Club's Hampshire and Dorset branch Autumn Dinner on 20 October 1989. On 4 April 1991, the London Evening Standard carried a front-page attack by the Monday Club against the proposed appointment of Janet Street-Porter for the position of the BBC's Head of Arts and Culture. Ultimately, she did not get the job. During his tenure as a Member of Parliament, John Carlisle regularly hosted Monday Club meetings in Committee Rooms at the House of Commons. He supported the gun lobby after the Dunblane tragedy.  The Almanac of British Politics recorded him as backing hanging and flogging and opposing feminism, homosexual law reform and the EEC.

South Africa and apartheid
Carlisle was opposed to the Gleneagles Agreement of 1977 which discouraged sporting ties to the apartheid regime in South Africa. In 1981 he called it a "worthless treaty" and urged the International Cricket Council (ICC) to readmit South Africa. Advocating the right of sportsmen to play wherever they wished, he offered his support for the 1982 English rebels tour saying that "many of us will salute the courage that has been shown by these players." After the Test and County Cricket Board banned players who had featured in the tour he described it as "a sorry day for international cricket." In 1983 he called on the Marylebone Cricket Club (MCC), as a club, to tour South Africa as a means of establishing if contemporary opinion polls approving of reviving sporting links were correct. The suggestion was rejected by MCC members.

In July 1982 he urged Margaret Thatcher to bring Enoch Powell into her cabinet. But she refused, saying that Powell would never be a member of any government of hers.Parliamentary Profiles A-D - Andrew Roth In February 1975 and April 1979 Thatcher herself said there would be no position for Powell in any government of hers.

In one of his interventions in a 1987 House of Commons debates, he claimed that "the system of apartheid in South Africa has worked in terms of government", although he claimed not to support it. Nevertheless, this defence of the South African government prompted journalist Edward Pearce to label him "the member for Bloemfontein West". Of the television screening of the April 1990 tribute concert in London for the newly freed Nelson Mandela, the MP said: "The BBC have just gone bananas over this and seem to be joining those who are making Mandela out to be a Christ-like figure." Carlisle observed: "This hero worship is misplaced." He had earlier described Mandela as a terrorist in 1988.

Later life
Carlisle announced that he would retire from politics in September 1996, and would not stand at the following General Election in 1997. He died at his home in Seal Chart, Kent, on 18 February 2019.

References

Bibliography
 Dod's Parliamentary Companion 1992, 173rd edition, East Sussex.
 Black, A & C.,Who's Who, London. (Various editions).
 Rhodesia to Zimbabwe - An Assessment, Policy Paper by the Monday Club's Foreign Affairs Committee, Chairman: John Carlisle, MP July 1982.
 Thompson, Cllr. Peter, (Foreword by John Carlisle, MP.), The United Nations Organisation, Discussion Paper by the Monday Club's Foreign Affairs Committee, October 1988.
  The Almanac of British Politics, London, 1996 (5th edition).

External links 
 

1942 births
2019 deaths
Conservative Party (UK) MPs for English constituencies
People educated at St Lawrence College, Ramsgate
UK MPs 1979–1983
UK MPs 1983–1987
UK MPs 1987–1992
UK MPs 1992–1997
People educated at Bedford School
British Eurosceptics